Jazz piano may refer to:

Jazz piano, a piano-oriented subgenre of jazz music
Piano Jazz, a radio show focused on the aforementioned genre